Lamentation of Christ is a 1511 painting created by the Flemish artist Quentin Matsys for the carpenters' guild in Antwerp Cathedral, where it still hangs.

The work is a triptych, with a central panel showing the Lamentation and side panels show the martyrdom of John the Evangelist and Salome presenting John the Baptist's head to Herod - the two Johns are the two patron saints of carpenters.

References

1511 paintings
Paintings by Quentin Matsys
Paintings in the Cathedral of Our Lady (Antwerp)
Triptychs
Paintings depicting John the Baptist
Massys
Paintings depicting John the Apostle